Bollendorf-Pont is a village in the commune of Berdorf, in eastern Luxembourg.  , the village had a population of 165.  It lies opposite the German town of Bollendorf.

Villages in Luxembourg
Echternach (canton)
Germany–Luxembourg border crossings